World University of Design (WUD) is a private university located in Rajiv Gandhi Education City, Sonipat, Haryana, India. The university was established in 2018 through The Haryana Private Universities (Second Amendment) Act 2017 following the passing of the Bill in October 2017. It claims to be "India's first and only university dedicated to education in the creative domain".

Campus
The campus provides hostel rooms to girls on-campus and to boys off-campus.

Schools 
The university comprises the following academics:

 School of Architecture
 School of Design
 School of Fashion
 School of Communication
 School of Visual Arts
 School of Management

References

External links

Sonipat
Universities in Haryana
Educational institutions established in 2018
2018 establishments in Haryana
Private universities in India